Pashupati Kumar Paras (born 12 July 1952) is an Indian politician who is currently serving as the Minister of Food Processing Industries in the Government of India. He is currently serving as a member of Lok Sabha from Hajipur (Lok Sabha constituency). He also held the post of the Minister of Animal and Fisheries Resources in the Government of Bihar. He is the younger brother of late Ram Vilas Paswan and he was also the State President of the Bihar unit of Lok Janshakti Party. He was elected as the National President of Lok Janshakti Party replacing Chirag Kumar Paswan in June 2021. After the faction in Lok Janshakti Party, he is National President of Rashtriya Lok Janshakti Party.

Political career
He has been a member of Bihar Legislative Assembly 7 times from Alauli since 1977. He has earlier served thrice as a minister in the state, having lost the last election in 2015. At the time of his appointment as a Minister in 2017, he was neither a member of Assembly nor Council and was therefore later accommodated as an MLC from the Governor's quota. 

He was elected as member of the 17th Lok Sabha in the 2019 Indian general election from Hajipur constituency. He became Minister of Food Processing Industry in Second Modi ministry when cabinet overhaul happened.

References 

People from Hajipur
Lok Janshakti Party politicians
Janata Party politicians
Bharatiya Lok Dal politicians
Janata Dal politicians
Janata Dal (United) politicians
Members of the Bihar Legislative Assembly
India MPs 2019–present
Living people
Narendra Modi ministry
1952 births